Exo Sud-Ouest sector is the bus service that operates bus routes from Montreal to Kahnawake, Châteauguay, Salaberry-de-Valleyfield, Saint-Zotique and Les Coteaux on the south shore of the St. Lawrence River in Quebec, Canada.

Bus routes

Regular routes

Rush hour routes

Future projects
In the late winter 2007, the City of Chateauguay conducted a feasibility study to determine whether or not a hovercraft connection would be profitable.  The suggested routes are Chateauguay/Old Montreal and Chateauguay/West Island.  This would be one solution in regards to dealing with the repairs on the Mercier Bridge expected during the summers of 2007, 2008, and 2009.  The city was also considering the option of adding a stop in Kahnawake on the existing Montreal / Delson / Candiac commuter train line.

See also 
 Exo (public transit) bus services

References

External links
  CITSO Homepage
  CITSO transit information on Agence métropolitaine de transport (Only corporate information is bilingual; the AMT does not offer travel information on its web site in English.)
  Complete CITSO Fleet Roster 

Châteauguay
Transit agencies in Quebec
Exo (public transit)
Transport in Montérégie
Transport in Roussillon Regional County Municipality
Le Haut-Saint-Laurent Regional County Municipality
Beauharnois-Salaberry Regional County Municipality
Transport in Vaudreuil-Soulanges Regional County Municipality
Vaudreuil-Dorion